What a Dummy is a syndicated television sitcom that lasted for one season in 1990 until 1991. The premise of the show was that the Brannigan family of Secaucus, New Jersey was getting advice from a talking, thinking ventriloquist's dummy named Buzz (voiced by Loren Freeman), who had been locked in a trunk for fifty years before being discovered by the family. Kaye Ballard played the family's next-door neighbor, Mrs. Treva Travalony. The animatronic puppet used for Buzz was created by special effects artists Alec Gillis and Tom Woodruff Jr. of Amalgamated Dynamics, and puppeteered by Mark Rappaport.

Cast
 Stephen Dorff as Tucker Brannigan
 Joshua Rudoy as Cory Brannigan
 David Doty as Ed Brannigan
 Annabel Armour as Polly Brannigan
 Janna Michaels as Maggie Brannigan
 Kaye Ballard as Treva Travalony
 Loren Freeman as Buzz (voice)

Episodes

International broadcast
The series also aired in Germany, as Der Familienschreck (The Family Fright), Spanish countries as Vaya muñeco (Go Doll), and Italy as L’amico di legno (The Wooden Friend).

External links
 
 

1990s American sitcoms
1990 American television series debuts
1991 American television series endings
First-run syndicated television programs in the United States
Television series by Universal Television
American television shows featuring puppetry
Television shows set in New Jersey
English-language television shows